The American Missionary Association (AMA) was a Protestant-based abolitionist group founded on  in Albany, New York. The main purpose of the organization was abolition of slavery, education of African Americans, promotion of racial equality, and spreading Christian values. Its members and leaders were of both races; The Association was chiefly sponsored by the Congregationalist churches in New England. The main goals were to abolish slavery, provide education to African Americans, and promote racial equality for free Blacks. The AMA played a significant role in several key historical events and movements, including the Civil War, Reconstruction, and the Civil Rights Movement.  

In the 1850s it assisted the operation of the Underground Railroad for men and women fleeing enslavement in the South. Starting in 1861, it opened camps in the South for former slaves. It played a major role during and after the Reconstruction Era in promoting education for blacks in the South by establishing numerous schools and colleges, as well as paying for teachers. It helped the establishment of Black churches and civic organizations. Its teachers and workers were targets for white supremacy groups such as the Ku Kux Klan. Outside the South it also promoted schools for Native Americans and immigrants. he AMA continued to play a role in the Civil Rights Movement in the 20th century, supporting the work of activists such as Martin Luther King Jr. and supporting legal efforts to desegregate public schools.

History
The American Missionary Association was started by members of the American Home Missionary Society (AHMS) and the American Board of Commissioners for Foreign Missions (ABCFM), who were disappointed that their first organizations refused to take stands against slavery and accepted contributions from slaveholders. From the beginning the leadership was integrated: the first board was made up of 12 men, four of them black. One of its primary objectives was to abolish slavery. The AMA (American Missionary Association) was one of the organizations responsible for pushing slavery onto the national political agenda.

The organization started the American Missionary magazine, published from 1846 through 1934.

Among the AMA's achievements was the founding of anti-slavery churches. For instance, the abolitionist Owen Lovejoy was among the Congregational ministers of the AMA who helped start 115 anti-slavery churches in Illinois before the American Civil War, aided by the strong westward migration of population to that area. Another member, Rev. Mansfield French, an Episcopalian who became a Methodist, helped found Wilberforce University in Ohio.

Members of the AMA began their support of education for blacks before the Civil War, recruiting teachers for the numerous contraband camps that developed in Union-occupied territory in the South during the war. In slaveholding Union states, such as Kentucky, the AMA staffed schools for both the newly emancipated United States Colored Troops and their families, such as at Camp Nelson, now known as Camp Nelson Heritage National Monument. Leading this effort was Rev. John Gregg Fee.  

Rev. French was assigned to Port Royal, South Carolina, and went on a speaking tour with Robert Smalls, who famously escaped enslavement, as well as met with President Abraham Lincoln, Secretary of War Edwin M. Stanton and Treasury Secretary Salmon P. Chase, jointly convincing them to allow blacks to serve in the Union military. By war's end, Union forces had organized 100 contraband camps, and many had AMA teachers. The AMA also served the Roanoke Island Freedmen's Colony (1863–1867). Located on an island occupied by Union troops, the colony was intended to be self-sustaining.  It was supervised by Horace James, a Congregational chaplain appointed by the Army as "Superintendent for Negro Affairs in the North Carolina District". The first of 27 teachers who volunteered through the AMA was his cousin, Elizabeth James.  By 1864 the colony had more than 2200 residents, and both children and adults filled the classrooms in the several one-room schools, as they were eager for learning. The missionary teachers also evangelized and helped provide the limited medical care of the time.

Reconstruction

Schools and colleges founded
The AMA's pace of founding schools and colleges increased during and after the war. Freedmen, historically free blacks (many of whom were "mulattoes" of mixed race), and white sympathizers alike believed that education was a priority for the newly freed people. Altogether, "the AMA founded eleven colleges and more than five hundred schools for the freedmen of the South during and after the Civil War. It spent  more money for that purpose than the Freedmen's Bureau of the federal government."

The colleges were:
 Berea College in Kenticky (1855)
 took over ownership of Atlanta University (1865), now Clark Atlanta University;
 Fisk University, (1866);
 Hampton Institute (1868); 
 Tougaloo College (1869); 
 Dillard University (1869);
 Talladega College (1867), founded as Swayne School
 LeMoyne–Owen College, (1871), founded as LeMoyne College
 Tillotson/Huston–Tillotson University, (now part of the College of Charleston);
 Avery Normal Institute (1867), (now part of the College of Charleston) 
 Howard University, in 1867, founded in cooperation with the Freedmen's Bureau.

Other work
In addition, the AMA organized the Freedmen's Aid Society, which recruited northern teachers for the schools and arranged to find housing for them in the South.

White supremacy counterattack
In the mid-1870s, white Democrats began to regain control of state legislatures through violence and intimidation at the polls that suppressed Republican voting. The Association expressed disappointment at the failures of the Reconstruction Era but never wavered in opposing disenfranchisement and continued the struggle over the following decades. By the 1870s, the AMA national office had relocated to New York City.

Overseas missions
While the AMA became widely known in the United States for its work in opposition to slavery and in support of education for freedmen, it also sponsored and maintained missions in numerous nations overseas. The 19th-century missionary effort was strong in India, China and east Asia. It was strongly supported by Congregational and Christian churches. Over time, the association became most closely aligned with the Congregational Christian Churches, established in 1931 as a union between those two groups of churches.

Most of those congregations became members of the United Church of Christ (UCC) in the late 20th century. The AMA maintained a distinct and independent identity until 1999, when a restructuring of the UCC merged it into the Justice and Witness Ministries division.

American Missionary
Its magazine, American Missionary, was published 1846–1934, and had a circulation of 20,000 in the 19th century, ten times that of the abolitionist William Garrison's magazine. The Cornell University Library has editions from 1878–1901 accessible online in its Making of America digital library.

Legacy
The records of the American Missionary Association are housed at the Amistad Research Center at Tulane University in New Orleans.

See also
 African American founding fathers of the United States
 American Home Missionary Society (AHMS) the AMA split from this group
 American Board of Commissioners for Foreign Missions (ABCFM), the AMA also split from this group
 American Baptist Home Mission Society, a rival group 
 Dan Beach Bradley — Siam, 1857 to 1873
 Gregory Normal School
 Lincoln Academy
 Freedmen's Schools

References

Further reading
 Beard, Augustus Field. A Crusade of Brotherhood: A History of the American Missionary Association (1907); the old official history. online  
 Blanchard, F. Q. "A Quarter Century in the American Missionary Association." Journal of Negro Education (1937): 152-156. online
 Brady, Patricia. "Trials and Tribulations: American Missionary Association Teachers and Black Education in Occupied New Orleans, 1863-1864." Louisiana History 31.1 (1990): 5-20. online

 Click, Patricia C. Time Full of Trial: The Roanoke Island Freedmen's Colony, 1862-1867 (Univ of North Carolina Press, 2003). online
 DeBoer, Clara Merritt. His truth is marching on: African Americans who taught the freedmen for the American missionary association, 1861-1877 (Routledge, 2016).

 Goldhaber, Michael. "A mission unfulfilled: Freedmen's education in North Carolina, 1865-1870." Journal of Negro History 77#4 (1992): 199-210. in JSTOR
 Harrold, Stanley. The abolitionists and the South, 1831-1861 (University Press of Kentucky, 1995).
 Johnson, Charles S. "The American Missionary Association Institute of Race Relations." Journal of Negro Education (1944): 568-574. online
 Jones, Jacqueline. "Women who were more than men: Sex and status in freedmen's teaching." History of Education Quarterly 19#1 (1979): 47-59. in JSTOR
 Morris, Robert C. Reading, 'Riting, and Reconstruction: The Education of Freedmen in the South, 1861-1870. (University of Chicago Press, 1981).
 Pearce, Larry Wesley. "The American Missionary Association and the Freedmen in Arkansas, 1863-1878."  Arkansas Historical Quarterly 30.2 (1971): 123-144. online
 Richardson, Joe M. Christian Reconstruction: The American Missionary Association and Southern Blacks, 1861-1890 (University of Alabama Press, 2009).  excerpt; The standard history.
 Richardson, Joe M., and Maxine D. Jones. Education for Liberation: The American Missionary Association and African Americans, 1890 to the Civil Rights Movement (University Alabama Press, 2015)
 Richardson, Joe M. "Fisk University: The First Critical Years." Tennessee Historical Quarterly 29.1 (1970): 24-41. online
 Weisenfeld, Judith. "'Who is Sufficient For These Things?' Sara G. Stanley and the American Missionary Association, 1864–1868." Church History 60#4 (1991): 493-507. in JSTOR

 Zipf, Karin L. "" Among These American Heathens": Congregationalist Missionaries and African American Evangelicals during Reconstruction, 1865-1878." North Carolina Historical Review 74.2 (1997): 111-134. online

External links
"Constitution of the American Missionary Association", The American Missionary, Roanoke Island Freedmen's Colony (1863–1867) Website
"American Missionary Association", North by South, Kenyon University, 1998
The American Missionary magazine, Project Gutenberg, most issues from 1888–1900
"Guide to the Records of the American Missionary Association", Amistad Research Center
"Annual Reports of the American Missionary Association, 1847-1905, through the HathiTrust"
"Guide to The American Missionary, 1867-1935"

 
United Church of Christ
Abolitionism in the United States
Pre-emancipation African-American history
Social history of the United States
Social history of the American Civil War
Reconstruction Era
History of education in the United States
Religious organizations based in the United States
Religious organizations established in 1846
1846 establishments in New York (state)